The mountain pademelon (Thylogale lanatus) is one of seven species of the genus Thylogale. It is found only in Papua New Guinea.

References

Macropods
Marsupials of New Guinea
Mammals of Papua New Guinea
Endemic fauna of New Guinea
Endemic fauna of Papua New Guinea
Mammals described in 1922
Taxa named by Oldfield Thomas